Käerjeng is a commune in southwestern Luxembourg, in the canton of Capellen. It lies on the border with Belgium. It has an area of 33.67 km2.

The commune of Käerjeng was formed on 1 January 2012 from the former communes of Bascharage and Clemency.  The law creating Käerjeng was passed on 24 May 2011.

With a population of approximately 10,000 citizens, Käerjeng is the 10th most-populous commune in Luxembourg.

Populated places
The commune consists of the following villages:

 Bascharage Section:
 Bascharage (seat)
 Hautcharage
 Linger

 Clemency Section:
 Clemency
 Fingig
 Schockmillen (lieu-dit)
 Nuechtbann (lieu-dit)
 Neudrisch (lieu-dit)

Geography
Käerjeng is located on the dividing line of the waters of the Rhine basin (Eisch) and the watershed of the Meuse (Chiers). It is bordered by the communes of Pétange, Differdange, Sanem, Dippach, Garnich and Steinfort, as well as the Belgian border to the north-west.

Total area:

Population

References

External links
 

 
Communes in Capellen (canton)